Ciro Sena Júnior (born 8 June 1982 in São João da Barra), or simply Ciro Sena, is a Brazilian footballer, a defender who currently plays for Remo.

External links 
 Ciro Sena at playmakerstats.com (English version of ogol.com.br)

Living people
1982 births
Brazilian footballers
Association football defenders
Clube do Remo players
People from São João da Barra